Peter Tuesday Hughes was an American science fiction and mystery author. He was an early exponent of the "gay gothic" subgenre. Though published primarily by Greenleaf Classics, a firm known for insisting that its authors include graphic sex in their works, his novels "[depict] gay relationships with a depth surprising for the markets he published for." However, some of his contemporaries objected to the pessimism Hughes occasionally expressed.

He was the creator of fictional detective Bruce Doe, who featured in six mystery novels that are now considered to "have an unexpected resonance in a post-9/11 world." In 2013, the Bruce Doe novels were named one of the ten best gay mystery series by the Lambda Literary Review.

A San Francisco travel agent, Hughes briefly partnered with fellow authors Dirk Vanden, Phil Andros, Richard Amory, Larry Townsend, and Douglas Dean in an attempt to found the first all-gay publishing company, which was to be called The Renaissance Group. The group was unable to secure funding for the attempt and several of its members ceased publishing shortly thereafter.

He died around 2005.

Bibliography

See also
Gay pulp fiction

References

20th-century American novelists
21st-century American novelists
American male novelists
American science fiction writers
American mystery writers
Year of death missing
Place of birth missing
Place of death missing
American gay writers
20th-century American male writers
Year of birth uncertain
21st-century American male writers